The 1948 Duquesne Dukes football team was an American football team that represented Duquesne University as an independent during the 1948 college football season. In its second season under head coach Kass Kovalcheck, Duquesne compiled a 2–7 record and was outscored by a total of 240 to 102.

Schedule

References

Duquesne
Duquesne Dukes football seasons
Duquesne Dukes football